Brooks Lee Raley (born June 29, 1988) is an American professional baseball pitcher for the New York Mets of Major League Baseball (MLB). He has previously played in MLB for the Chicago Cubs, Cincinnati Reds, Houston Astros and Tampa Bay Rays, and in the KBO League for the Lotte Giants. Raley played college baseball for the Texas A&M Aggies. The Cubs selected Raley in the sixth round of the 2009 MLB draft and he made his MLB debut with them in 2012.

Career

Chicago Cubs
Raley attended Uvalde High School in Uvalde, Texas, and Texas A&M University, where he played college baseball for the Texas A&M Aggies. The Chicago Cubs selected Raley in the sixth round of the 2009 Major League Baseball draft. The Cubs promoted Raley to the major leagues for the first time on August 7, 2012. He had three stints with the Cubs in 2013, while spending the majority of the season with the Iowa Cubs of the Class AAA Pacific Coast League.

2014 season
On February 12, 2014, Raley was claimed off waivers by the Minnesota Twins. He was then designated for assignment by the Twins and claimed off waivers by the Los Angeles Angels of Anaheim on May 8.

Lotte Giants
On December 14, 2014, Raley signed a contract with the Lotte Giants, a team in the KBO League based in Busan. Raley remained with the Giants in 2016, and signed a one-year, $850,000 contract for the 2017 season on January 8, 2017. In five seasons with Lotte from 2015 through 2019, Raley produced a 48–53 record with a 4.13 ERA and 755 strikeouts over  innings.

Cincinnati Reds
On January 9, 2020, Raley signed a minor league deal with the Cincinnati Reds that included an invitation to spring training. He made the Reds' Opening Day roster. Raley pitched in four innings in four games for Cincinnati, marking his first MLB action since 2013 before being designated for assignment on August 6.

Houston Astros
On August 9, 2020, Raley was traded to the Houston Astros in exchange for a player to be named later, minor league pitcher Fredy Medina.

In 2020 with Houston, Raley was 0–1 with one save and a 3.94 ERA in 16 innings in which he struck out 21 batters, over 17 relief appearances. On November 1, the Astros picked up Raley's $2 million option for the 2021 season.

In 2021, Raley was 2–3 with two saves and a 4.78 ERA.  In 58 games he pitched 49.0 innings and struck out 65 batters.  On November 3, 2021, Raley was declared a free agent.

Tampa Bay Rays
On November 30, 2021, Raley signed a two-year, $10 million contract with the Tampa Bay Rays.

On June 4, 2022, Raley, along with 4 other Rays teammates, opted out of wearing a Rays team logo and cap in support of LGBTQ+ Pride, during the team's annual Pride Night celebration at Tropicana Field.

New York Mets
On December 7, 2022, the Rays traded Raley to the New York Mets for Keyshawn Askew.

Personal life
Raley's parents are Terry and DeeAnna Raley. His father joined the Toronto Blue Jays organization after being selected in the 1981 Major League Baseball draft, and played for the Medicine Hat Blue Jays and the Kinston Blue Jays before ending his professional baseball career in 1982. Two of Raley's brothers have also played minor league baseball. Elder brother Russell was drafted by the New York Yankees in 2006. After his playing career ended in 2007, Russell became a coach. Younger brother Cory was chosen by the Cleveland Indians in 2012, and played his final season of minor league baseball in 2016.

Raley met Rachel Shipley at Texas A&M, where she played for the women's soccer team, and they later married. The couple have four children, three daughters and a son.

References

External links

1988 births
Living people
American expatriate baseball players in South Korea
Baseball players from San Antonio
Major League Baseball pitchers
KBO League pitchers
Chicago Cubs players
Lotte Giants players
Cincinnati Reds players
Houston Astros players
Tampa Bay Rays players
Texas A&M Aggies baseball players
Arizona League Cubs players
Boise Hawks players
Daytona Cubs players
Tennessee Smokies players
Iowa Cubs players
Rochester Red Wings players
Salt Lake Bees players
People from Uvalde, Texas